At the 1958 British Empire and Commonwealth Games, the athletics events were held at Cardiff Arms Park in Cardiff, Wales in July 1958. A total of 29 athletics events were contested at the Games, 20 by men and 9 by women. Four Games records were improved during the competition and three world records were set (at 440 yards hurdles, women's javelin, women's 4 x 110 yards relay).

Medal summary

Men

Women

Medal table

Participating nations

 (29)
 (1)
 (10)
 (23)
 (2)
 (88)
 (3)
 (10)
 (2)
 (1)
 (12)
 (3)
 (8)
 (2)
 (10)
 (1)
 (4)
 (19)
 (30)
 (1)
 (19)
 (13)
 (2)
 (3)
 (38)
 Sierra Leone (9)
 (1)
 (19)
 (5)
 (8)
 (6)
 (42)

References

Results
Commonwealth Games Medallists - Men. GBR Athletics. Retrieved on 2010-08-30.
Commonwealth Games Medallists - Women. GBR Athletics. Retrieved on 2010-08-30.

1958 British Empire and Commonwealth Games events
1958
British Empire and Commonwealth Games
International athletics competitions hosted by Wales